The Manhattan Film Festival (MFF) is an annual film festival. It was founded in 2006 by filmmakers Philip J. Nelson and Jose Ruiz Jr. 

MFF is currently operated by Mr. Nelson and Mr. Ruiz, along with a team of filmmakers, journalists, and exhibitors. It was founded as the Independent Features Film Festival. MFF is an annual event that has been held at prominent venues such as Symphony Space, Quad Cinema, and the Academy Theater at Lighthouse. MFF has also been held at smaller venues like the Producers Club and the Hunter College Lang Auditorium, and currently screens all films at the legendary Cinema Village theater. 

In 2012, the Manhattan Film Festival was named 25 Film Festivals Worth the Entry Fee: 2012 by MovieMaker Magazine.  In response to increased submissions, the festival expanded its program from just under 150 selections to 163 in 2013.

Festival mission
According to the festival's press materials: The goal of the Manhattan Film Festival has always been to help independent filmmakers find an audience for their work and connect with like minded individuals in the indie film community. Every year, the festival works to program a diverse film lineup ranging from student filmmakers and first time directors/actors to the industry's most accomplished talent.

To further support the independent film community in New York, the festival offers a widely popular revenue sharing program through their affiliate sponsor ScreenBooker, a rarity with most American film festivals and one of the features of MFF that accounted for its inclusion on multiple "Top Fests" lists, including two lists from MovieMaker Magazine.

Notable incidents

In July 2010, Manhattan Film Festival founders Philip J. Nelson and Jose Ruiz filed a lawsuit against the Tribeca Film Festival for unfair competition. The founders accused Tribeca Film Festival of stealing their idea for a virtual film festival.

An Indiewire article in 2013 quoted former festival participants as saying the festival was "rampantly disorganized". The article cited examples of last-minute venue changes, screening the wrong version of films, and failing to communicate with filmmakers. The article was quickly refuted by numerous readers of the publication. One article contributor noted the writer "works for the Tribeca Film Institute and is likely representing Tribeca by writing this ridiculous and bias article. Some of the filmmakers he interviewed have come forward and verified that Guerrasio left out important, positive statements, in an effort to slander the Manhattan Film Festival."

Notable films and awards
 The festival created the Buzz Award in 2007, presenting it to Apostles of Park Slope. The filmmaker, Jason Cusato went on to form The Art of Brooklyn Film Festival, one of the most popular independent film festivals in Brooklyn.
 In 2011, the festival screened White Irish Drinkers, a film written and directed by John Gray. He is the creator of Ghost Whisperer, a CBS television series starring Jennifer Love Hewitt.
 2011, Jeff Stewart won Best Actor for his role in Under Jakob's Ladder. He is best known in the United Kingdom for his role as Reg Hollis in the ITV series The Bill. His win at the festival inspired stories in the British media. Stewart even got a story in the New York Times as The Chelsea Guest Who Wouldn't Leave  when the Hotel Chelsea abruptly closed its doors in 2011.
 In 2012 the Film Heals Award was presented to a number of films, including Dreams Are Not Forgotten by Nigel Barker.
 In 2012 the festival introduced the New York Spotlight Award, a recognition given to a locally made film that features New York City in a compelling and inspiring way.
 In 2013 the New York Spotlight Award was given to two films: On The Radioman, which was received by Radioman himself and If These Knishes Could Talk.
 In 2013, Yuck! A 4th Grader's Documentary About School Lunch was screened at the festival. A 20-minute documentary by 11-year-old, Zachary Maxwell. As a student at P.S. 130 in Little Italy, Maxwell documented the less-than-appetizing school lunches. This documentary won the festival's Buzz Award. He was interviewed by such outlets as Good Morning America and the New York Times.

References

External links
 Manhattan Film Festival – Official Site

Film festivals in New York City
Festivals in Manhattan
Culture of Manhattan